Effutu is a village in Effutu Municipal District in the Central Region of Ghana. The village is known for the Effutu Secondary School. The school is a second cycle institution.

References

The Effutu people inhabit Winneba in the Central Region of Ghana and they are part of the original Guan inhabitants of Ghana.

Populated places in the Central Region (Ghana)